Albert King (24 December 1878 – 28 October 1946) was a South African cricket umpire. He stood in three Test matches in 1931.

See also
 List of Test cricket umpires

References

1878 births
1946 deaths
Cricketers from Durban
South African Test cricket umpires